Veľké Revištia is a village and municipality in the Sobrance District in the Košice Region of east Slovakia.

History
In historical records the village was first mentioned in 1335.

Geography
The village lies at an altitude of 112 metres and covers an area of 10.194 km².
It has a population of 540 people.

Facilities
The village has a public library, gymnasium and a soccer pitch. The local club TJ FK Veľké Revistia is currently playing the IV. league south in the eastern region, which is the fifth highest league in Slovakia. Notable players are Štefan Grendel, the father of the Slovakia national football team player Erik Grendel, and Dušan Sninský.

External links
https://web.archive.org/web/20070513023228/http://www.statistics.sk/mosmis/eng/run.html
http://www.fkrevistia.sk/
http://www.velkerevistia.sk/
http://en.e-obce.sk/obec/velkerevistia/velke-revistia.html

Villages and municipalities in Sobrance District